Feriansyah Mas'ud or just Feriansyah (born January 25, 1991) is an Indonesian footballer that currently plays for Pelita Jaya in the Indonesia Super League.

Honours

Club honors
Pelita Jaya U-21
Indonesia Super League U-21 (1): 2008–09

References

External links

1991 births
Living people
People from Palembang
Indonesian footballers
Pelita Jaya FC players
Liga 1 (Indonesia) players
Association football forwards